Rania Hussein Amin (born 1965) (Arabic: رانية حسين أمين) is an Egyptian children's book writer and illustrator. She was known from Fxryfjsxryjswrtharhana's book series, which she also illustrates. Her drawings and writings were published in “Nos El Donia” and “Qatar Al Nada” magazine, in addition to which she wrote more than 45 books and designed book drawings by well-known authors, such as “Me and I” by Michel Hanna. Amin was also one of the educational figures in her career, contributing to the education of children with special needs, and through her books and Farhana's character that she designed, she calls for the practices that parents should follow when raising their children.

Personal life 
When she reached the age of twenty, she began writing short stories, and after graduating from university, Amin decided to write children's books, when she designed Farhana's character.

Education 
Amin studied at the German school in Cairo (DEO) then received GCE in 1984  Despite Amin's talent in art, she did not enroll in the College of Fine Arts and preferred to study psychology at the American University in Cairo, but she fixed the situation after graduating from the university and joined the free department of the College of Fine Arts, where she studied photography and ceramics. She continued to place her talent in Florence, learned to draw, and participated in a number of group exhibitions there. Throughout her life, Amin has participated as a writer and illustrator in numerous workshops and courses in art, film and animation.

Professional life 
Art Work:
2021	Wrote لماذا هذه الكلبة بالذات؟ (published by Dar El Sherouk)
2021	Wrote ذراع ثقيل فوق كتفي  (published by Dar El Sherouk)
2020	Wrote and illustrated the story "إغتراب" published within a collection of graphic short stories by 8 artists from Tunisia and Egypt by Dar El Mahroosa
2020	Wrote and illustrated مش أكلة، مش لعبة، مش أراجوز  (Comics for all ages, self-published)
2020	Wrote هل أنت سعيد (published by Dar El Shorouk)
2019	Wrote منكوش (published by Dar El Sherouk)
2019	Participated in “ElMazg” workshop to create a comics story about Fear in Folklore, wrote and illustrated an 8 page comics إغتراب
2019	Wrote أين الابتسامة الحلوة؟ (published by Nahdet Masr)
2018	Wrote  رافعة الأثقال (published by Nahdet Masr)
2018	Wrote الملكة سهيلة a novel for young adults (published by the “Arab Woman Association” and Nahdet Masr)
2018	Wrote إسمعني (published by Al-Balsam Publishing House).
2018	Wrote "إفرد ظهرك وارفع رأسك وقل كم أنا جميل" (published by Nahdet Masr)
2017	Participated in writing the script for the prize-winning short movie “The Mountain” that was shown in “Biennale Venezia 2017” and “AVIFF - Art Film festival 2021” in Cannes 
2017	Wrote برة الدايرة and ورا القناع (novels for young adults) (published by Dar El-Shorouk)
2016	Wrote "صراخ خلف الأبواب" (A Scream behind Doors) for young adults (Publisher: Nahdet Masr).  
2015	Wrote & illustrated the educational graphic book “…With Lots of Love” about parenting tips and real life stories done in comics form (Hawadit Publishing House)
2015	Wrote & participated in the illustration of “فاقد الحب يعطيه” for early teens, (published by Al-Balsam Publishing house). 
2015	Wrote a children’s story (Zinnia) and wrote and illustrated a comics (“What’s left of them.. and us”) published in Rowayat magazine for children & teens 
2014	Illustrating for El-Delta El-Yom Newspaper & wrote & illustrated in Qatr El Nada magazine
2012	Wrote, Illustrated & Published the comic book for children “One Miserable Bully” (Hawadit Publishing House)
2012	Wrote, Illustrated & Published the Mini-Guide for Children about “Bullying” (Hawadit Publishing House)
2012	Illustrated the graphic short story book “أنا وأنا”, published by Comics Publishing House.
2010	Edited & participated in writing & illustrating the graphic short story "خارج السيطرة"  (published by “El-Ain Publishing House”)
2010:                           Wrote and illustrated 4 Farhana books (for pre-schoolers) (Elias Publishing House)
		فرحانة تحب الألوان
		فرحانة تحب عيد ميلادها
		فرحانة تحب الأشكال
		فرحانة تحب المشاركة
2009:                          Wrote & illustrated 4 Farhana books (for 6 – 10 year old children) (Elias Publishing House)
		فرحانة وصديق مختلف حقا
		فرحانة فوحديقة بدون حيوانات
		فرحانة تتكلم وتتكلم وتتكلم
		فرحانة وسر جمالها
2008	Writing of TV animation series for children (Baby Boo) (for Al-Sahar cartoon production company) (has not been produced)
2008:                          Farhana exhibition in Darb1718 gallery, Cairo, exhibiting a number of photography, scripts and illustrations
2007:                          Wrote & illustrated a motivators’ booklet to raise the awareness
                                    in villages on the importance of protecting our environment. (for CENACT)
2006	Participated in workshop for creating of a comic book on female-circumcision organized by “The Childhood and Motherhood Council” (creating a 10 page comic story)
2006:	Translated “Das Maedchen Fragebuch” (for teen-agers) from German to Arabic. (Elias Publishing House)
2006:	Translated the 6-book series “Cleo” for children from German to Arabic (Elias Publishing House)
2006:	Translated the 5-book series “Daisy” for children from English to Arabic (Elias Publishing House)
2006:	Wrote & illustrated the book “The Disappearance of the Nile” (Elias Publishing House)
2006:	Wrote & illustrated the book “Farhana in Nature” (Elias Publishing House)
2006:	Wrote the book “Where did the Smoke go?” (Elias Publishing House)
2006:	Wrote the book “Fashionable Garbage” (Elias Publishing House)
2006:	Wrote the book “Affoor and the bird” (Elias Publishing House)
2006:	Designed & illustrated two school posters about protecting the environment (Elias Publishing House)
2006:	Wrote & illustrated a 30-pages comic book on female circumcision for “The Childhood & Motherhood Council” 
2005:	Illustrated the book “TV dangers” by Dr. Soheir El-Masry.
2005:	Worked on an animation film about street-children for the UNICEF.
2004:	Wrote & illustrated the book “Farhana Imagines (Rapunzel)” 2004:	Wrote & illustrated. the book “Farhana Imagines (Jack & Beanstalk)” (Elias Publishing House) (not published)
2003:	Participated in the Comics exhibition in Townhouse Gallery, Cairo.	
2002:	Participated at the Bologna Bookfair exhibition for Arab Children’s books’ illustrators, in Bologna, Italy.
2001:	Wrote & illustrated a children’s book called “Siwa”. (published by Elias Publishing House)
2000:	Wrote & illustrated a children’s book called “When the bird discovered its wings” (published by Elias Publishing House)
2000:	Translated “Mona & the Tree of Osiris”, “Moody & the Hieroglyphic Gun” and “The Sacred Lake” from English to Arabic (published by Elias Publishing House)
1999:	Wrote & illustrated a series of 12 books about a character called “Farhana” (published by Elias Publishing House)
1998-99:	Wrote a number of short stories, 4 of them were published in “Nos El-Donya” magazine.
1998:	Participated in the “Small Art works” exhibition in the “Center of Arts”, Cairo, with 8 paintings.
1995:	Participated in the Heliorama Painting exhibition at the French Cultural Center in Cairo
1994:	Participated in the Painting exhibition at Salem Salah’s studio in Cairo.

Prizes:
2021                            Obtained prize for best book for Young Adults for my book الملكة سهيلة in the مسابقة الملتقى العربي
2021                            Short list in مسابقة الملتقى العربي for the book هل أنت سعيد
2017                            Short list & nomination of فاقد الحب يعطيه ” (“Itisalat”)
2016	Obtained “Itisalat” first prize for “A Scream behind Doors” for Young Adults.
2013	Obtained “Kitabi” prize from “El Fikr ElArabi” for the writing & illustration of “When the Bird discovered its Wings”
2012	Obtained a prize from “Arab Thought Foundation” on “Farhana and a Special Friend”
2011	Obtained a prize on “فرحانة وصديق مختلف حقا”	from Anna Lindh foundation.
2010                            Short list & nomination of “فرحانة وسر جمالها” (“Itisalat”)
2000                            Obtained Suzan Mubarak children’s literature prize in writing on “عندما إكتشف الطائر جناحيه"”
1999                            Obtained Suzan Mubarak children’s literature prize in illustration on	the "فرحانة" series.

References 

Egyptian illustrators
Egyptian short story writers
1965 births
Living people